Lincoln Burrows, played by Dominic Purcell, is a fictional character and one of the two protagonists of the American television series Prison Break. The plot of Prison Break revolves around Lincoln being framed for the murder of the vice president's brother and Lincoln's brother, Michael Scofield’s (Wentworth Miller) plan to help him escape his death sentence. In flashbacks, teenage Lincoln is played by Max Kirsch, and for one episode, Hunter Jablonski.

As one of the principal characters, Lincoln plays a prominent role in the series and appeared in every episode. The brothers' relationship is frequently explored in the series as their sacrifices for each other form a large part of the plot. In an interview, series creator Paul Scheuring commented that it was "extremely difficult" to cast the roles of Lincoln and Michael. Dominic Purcell was cast for the role just three days before the start of production of the series pilot.

Background
Lincoln's parents worked for the company but were both killed so Aldo (Michael's father) took him in and raised him as his own. Neither Lincoln nor Michael knew this until season 4 (the writer of the episode, Karyn Uscher, revealed on the episode audio commentary that this is a lie - Lincoln really is Michael's biological brother). After their mother's falsified death, Lincoln became Michael's guardian. Lincoln dropped out of Morgan Park High School in Toledo, Ohio during his sophomore year and moved to Chicago to begin his life of crime. Prior to being convicted for the murder of the Vice President's brother, he had been convicted of theft, criminal damage to property, possession of drug paraphernalia, and battery. He and Lisa Rix had a son together, Lincoln Burrows, Jr. (L.J.) (played by Marshall Allman).

When Michael was 18, Lincoln borrowed $90,000 to pay for Michael's university education, telling him that it was his half of his mother's life insurance. There really was no life insurance and this money was the start of the events which ultimately led to Lincoln being sentenced to death. This was revealed in the flashback episode, "Brother's Keeper." Lincoln's actions made Michael feel guilt and responsibility, which explains his reason for creating an elaborate plan to rescue his brother.

Lincoln is accused of murdering the vice president's brother, Terrence Steadman. Although he pleaded not guilty at the trial, he was convicted on all counts and sentenced to death due to an overwhelming amount of evidence. After exhausting all of his appeals, his execution date was set for May 11, 2006. At the start of the show, he has only one month left.

Appearances

Season 1 

The character of Lincoln Burrows is first seen on newspaper articles in Michael Scofield's apartment. He makes his first real appearance later in the pilot episode when he is seen in the prison yard. It is established that Michael is his brother and a flashback sequence demonstrates the close bond of trust between them, as well as Michael's intention of breaking Lincoln out. After a surprise meeting with his brother inside the prison's chapel in the series pilot, Lincoln realizes that Michael is now an inmate. In the first two episodes, Lincoln's character and background is established, like his complicated and strained relationships with his teenage son L.J. and his ex-girlfriend Veronica Donovan. Particularly in the first few episodes, Lincoln warns Michael of the dangers in the prison and that he should be aware of his fellow inmates. As Michael begins to reveal his escape plan, Lincoln often takes a skeptical stance in the early episodes, trying to convince his brother of the futility in attempting escape and attempts to persuade Michael to abandon his plan, something he refuses to do. As the season progresses, Lincoln grows carefully hopeful of Michael's plan to help him escape. In episode "English, Fitz or Percy", Lincoln admits that he had resigned himself to his fate, but that Michael has given him his hope back. The next episode "Riots, Drills and the Devil" further explores the tight bond between the protagonists.

As the season progresses, Lincoln's relationships with his son, L. J., and Veronica Donovan (played by Robin Tunney) grow stronger. L.J. slowly reconnects with his estranged father over several visits, while Veronica becomes convinced of his innocence and attempts to find evidence to exonerate him. Aside from scenes in visitation, Lincoln mostly appears in scenes with Michael in the chapel, with the rest of the escape team on PI or in his cell on death row, which coincidentally in real life, is the same cell that John Wayne Gacy was incarcerated in during his time at Joliet Prison. From the eighth episode onwards, Lincoln and the rest of the escapees begin to dig a hole in the guard's break room. When L.J. is framed for murder by the conspiracy, Lincoln becomes worried and starts behaving irrationally, making him a liability to the escape plan. A secret message from L.J. in the episode "Tweener" manages to reassure him somewhat, however. In "Odd Man Out", Lincoln is forced to distract a guard to keep him from discovering the escape tunnel. Out of options, Lincoln punches the guard in the face and is sent to solitary. Despite this, Michael gets him transferred to the infirmary on the night on the escape for food poisoning. Lincoln is one of six inmates that are part of the failed escape attempt in "End of the Tunnel." When it fails, he resigns to his fate.

The character plays a central role in "The Rat", in which Lincoln prepares himself for the upcoming execution. The viewers are shown that he goes through different emotions, ranging from anger to sadness to plain numbness, as he is finally strapped to the electric chair at the end of the episode. His execution is delayed at the last minute with the help of a mysterious man that Lincoln identifies as his father Aldo Burrows (played by Anthony Denison), despite not having seen him for thirty years. But when Lincoln tries to explain in "By the Skin and the Teeth" that he saw his father in the viewing room on the night of the execution, he is met with skepticism. In the following episodes, Lincoln spends most of his scenes locked up in solitary and plays only a minor role in the plot. In "The Key" Lincoln's prison transport is ambushed en route to seeing his son L.J. and he is almost murdered by Secret Service agent Paul Kellerman (played by Paul Adelstein), a member of the conspiracy. Lincoln is rescued by his father, who explains to him that the murder setup of Terrence Steadman may have been caused by his desolation of "The Company" after taking information with him about Steadman's company, Ecofield. Lincoln is re-captured soon afterwards. He is considered an attempted fugitive and returned to solitary, as nobody believes that there was an assassination attempt against him. He escapes successfully in "Go", and the first-season finale finally sees Lincoln outside the prison walls with his brother.

Season 2 

The character is featured more prominently in the second season than the first. He is featured mainly in scenes with his brother or the other escapees, and gets to take on a more active role than in the first season. Along with his brother and the other escapees in the season premiere, Lincoln successfully evades Brad Bellick (played by Wade Williams) and his guards. At the end of the episode he is heavily traumatized after talking with Veronica Donovan over the phone and hearing her getting executed by conspiracy agents. Outside the prison, Lincoln's first priority is to find his son, and the second episode "Otis" is dedicated to Michael and Lincoln's failed attempt to rescue L.J. from the court house. After the failed impromptu prison-break, Lincoln has no choice but to accompany his brother on a journey to Utah to retrieve Charles Westmoreland's five million dollars. Lincoln's anxiety for L.J. causes conflicts with Michael, who wants to follow his plan. The next three episodes sees Michael and Lincoln reuniting with several members of the escape team. Together they find the site of the former silo and begins to dig for the money. In "Buried", Lincoln's motivation to save his son is triggered again as he overhears on the news that L.J. is being released. Against Michael objections, Lincoln leaves the house at the end of the episode to find L.J., and the two characters have separate plotlines for the next few episodes.

In the next episode "Dead Fall", Lincoln discovers that reuniting with L.J. might prove difficult, as he learns that he is monitored by agents of "The Company." Lincoln manages to provide a distraction and escape with his son. In "Unearthed", Lincoln appears in scenes with L.J., providing character development and building up the relationship between them. At the end of the episode, they are identified and arrested by the police. It is Lincoln's father Aldo that comes to his son's rescue, sending men to secure Lincoln and L.J. This begins Lincoln's more direct involvement of the conspiracy plotline of the show, as his father outlines his plan to bring down The Company once and for all. In "Disconnect", the two characters meet with Michael. Aldo is later killed by F.B.I. agent Alexander Mahone (played by William Fichtner), which prompts Michael and Lincoln to stop running and to find evidence to expose "The Company" by searching for Sara Tancredi (played by Sarah Wayne Callies). In "The Killing Box", Michael and Lincoln are taken into custody by the Border Patrol. On route back to Fox River, operatives of The Company helps them escape from the prison transport van in hopes of eliminating the brothers once and for all. The protagonists escape this death trap at the last minute, when they are aided by Paul Kellerman, who in an act of self-preservation, turns against "The Company." At the end of the fall final, the brothers have no choice but to go along with their new uneasy ally.

In "John Doe" Lincoln comes face to face with Terrence Steadman, the man he was convicted of murdering. Steadman commits suicide and forces Lincoln and Michael to look for an alternative way to prove Lincoln's innocence. Lincoln, Michael and Kellerman find Sara and together, they head back to Chicago, where Sara's father, Frank Tancredi (played by John Heard), had hidden the USB drive which holds a recorded conversation between Caroline Reynolds and Terrence Steadman after his supposed death date. When the tape proves to be useless as evidence, Lincoln and Michael attempt to blackmail President Caroline Reynolds (played by Patricia Wettig). When this also fails, Lincoln and Michael are forced to leave the country. In Sona Lincoln's exoneration finally comes through when Paul Kellerman decides to testify against "The Company." This makes Lincoln one of the two Fox River Eight members who have successfully evaded capture by the authorities. The brothers' joy is short-lived when Company executive Bill Kim (played by Reggie Lee) tracks them down in Panama and has orders to kill "one of them." Sara shoots Kim, allowing them to escape. As the police draw near, Lincoln, Michael and Sara flee from the scene but are separated in the process. Michael takes the blame for Kim's death and is sent to the Panamanian prison Sona. Ignorant of his brother's recapture, Lincoln searches for Michael and Sara in the season finale before spotting Sara traveling alone. In his last scene of the season, Lincoln tries to get her attention but loses her in the crowd.

Season 3 

Lincoln uses his free status to try to help Michael get out of Sona Prison. He manages to get the consul to transfer Michael to a cleaner and safer prison. While explaining the situation, Michael instructed him to find Sara. The local authorities believe they've found Sara's body, which turned out not to be her. Lincoln is then called by his son LJ and is instructed to meet him and Sara at a bar, but instead he encounters a stranger calling herself Susan B. Anthony (Jodi Lyn O'Keefe), who lets Lincoln know that Sara and LJ have been kidnapped and will be killed if Michael doesn't break out a man imprisoned in Sona named James Whistler.

As Michael plots his escape, Lincoln does some sleuthing of his own on the outside: he follows Whistler's girlfriend Sofia Lugo and manages to acquire an ornithology guide with Whistler's notes in it. As Michael begins to have doubts, Lincoln takes matters into his own hands, tracking down Sara and LJ and knocking out two Company agents before the other agents escape with their hostages. Following his failed attempt, Lincoln receives what he believed to be Sara's head in a box. He decides not to tell Michael, who instructs Lincoln to recruit the grave digger. Lincoln is also forced to hand the real bird book to Susan. At the same time, Fernando Sucre and Sofia Lugo offer their assistance.
 
Lincoln goes about procuring a getaway vehicle. After finding the roads are heavily guarded, Linc buys some supplies at a dive shop, and then goes with Sofia to the beach, not far from the prison, where he buries them. Susan's threat of killing LJ forced Lincoln to back down and follow her orders, instead of trying to outsmart her. The next two episodes follow the escape plan and after the escape ultimately fails, Lincoln engages in a tense standoff with Susan to rescue L.J. but Lincoln is forced to back down again. Susan, while planning for the Bang and Burn operation, then sent Company agents to eliminate Sofia, Sucre and him but this ultimately fails. When the operation fails, Susan decided to try to get Lincoln back into the plan by letting him see LJ.

While figuring out the escape plan, Lincoln goes about buying a bomb to plan an explosive finish for Susan and tried to use Sucre to trick her, but both attempts ultimately fail. Sucre and Maricruz were also implicated as a result, though without Lincoln's knowing. Later on, Susan used Sofia as a hostage. That night, Lincoln steals a bus to knock out the power lines to Sona Prison, which then starts off the escape of Michael and the other inmates inside Sona Prison. The escape is eventually successful, with Lincoln joining the inmates and McGrady parting off with his dad in separate ways. Whistler later tried to escape, but Lincoln managed to get hold of him, forcing Gretchen to carry out the hostage exchange successfully at a museum. Later on, Gretchen's men open fire on police, so that Gretchen and Whistler could escape unharmed but the firing caused Sofia to be shot.

In the season finale, Lincoln, LJ and Sofia were last seen at the hospital, where LJ is tending to Sofia's wounds.

Season 4

Lincoln is first seen with LJ and Sofia in a restaurant in Panama. When a confused Michael calls him and asks if he is sure that he saw Sara's head in the box, he says he did. Lincoln is later attacked by a Company agent, Lincoln kills him, which leads him to being arrested and extradited. When brought to America and reunited with Michael. They meet Donald Self, a homeland security agent, who gives him, along with Michael, Sucre, Mahone, and Bellick, two choices: either go back to jail or bring down The Company. When Lincoln is first put with the other convicts, Michael, Sara, Bellick, Sucre, Roland and Mahone he isn't happy to be stuck with the bunch only caring for his younger brother and Sara and having some good feelings towards Sucre. He and Bellick rarely exchange words but Roland often gets on his nerves and he doesn't like the kid, only putting up with him because he's the computer nerd and without him the cons could only do half a job. Mahone is a different story, he swears revenge of his father's death once they fulfill Self's mission. When Lincoln overhears a phone call in which Mahone tells Lang the company killed his son Lincoln relates to the man (the company tried to kill LJ previously) and promises Mahone that after the mission, together they would track down the person(s) who killed Cameron. Lincoln forms a fondness for Mahone and realizes the two aren't as different as he initially thought and although he can't forgive the other man for killing his father he has grown sympathetic towards him. He also has a good relationship with Bellick eventually because Bellick on several occasions saved his life, like in "Eagles and Angels" when Bellick distracts a Company goon about to kill Lincoln.

In the episode "Quiet Riot", along with Michael, Sucre, and Mahone, Lincoln enters through the company HQ and reaches to the actual Scylla machine. In episode "Selfless" they are caught by the General and his goons, although that was the plan. The goons are about to shoot Michael, although they are held at gunpoint by Mahone and Sucre. Lincoln holds the General at gunpoint. The General is forced to give up his card, which he thinks is useless, although he is shocked when Michael shows him the other 5 Scylla cards. They take him hostage and later escape with Scylla, though they are betrayed by Self at the end of the episode. In the episode "Deal Or No Deal" Lincoln is captured by homeland security agents and agrees to testify against Self for immunity. Michael comes in and they are about to be killed by the Homeland Security agents, until a Company agent saves them by murdering the Homeland Security agents and is about to bring Michael and Lincoln to the General. Sucre sneaks up behind the agent and points the gun at him and Lincoln takes the agent's weapon and kills him. In "Just Business", he is worried about Michael's health as they keep trying to get Scylla back. Lincoln uses a rocket launcher to blast Self's hotel window. He runs to the alleyway, seeing Michael with a bloody nose and unconscious, picked up and thrown in a Company van. He goes to confront the General face to face and says he'll do anything to save Michael, even getting Scylla back to The Company. Lincoln tells Michael that he discovered that their mother had also worked for The Company and that he is going to get Scylla back for them to save Michael's life.

In the following episodes, Lincoln works on getting Scylla back, and is assigned a team by the general, consisting of Self, Gretchen and T-Bag. They are later joined by Mahone. When the general is displeased at their lack of progress, he sends photos of their loved ones, threatening to hurt them if the team does not find Scylla. Lincoln is also opposed by Michael, who seeks to find Scylla first and bring down The Company. The protagonists also learn that their mother, Christina Rose Scofield, is alive and that she is the one in possession of Scylla. In the episode "SOB", Lincoln is framed by Christina for the murder of a high-ranking Indian official. Michael puts their differences aside, however, and rescues Lincoln. They escape from the police in "Cowboys and Indians", and manages to steal Scylla from Christina. She responds by capturing Lincoln and shooting him in the lung, telling Michael that Lincoln will die if he does not return Scylla to her. The episode ends with Michael having to decide between saving Sara or Linc. In the next episode he decides to save them both, and sends Mahone with an explosive device to kill Christina and rescue Lincoln while Michael saves Sara. The plan is successful. After they are unexpectedly contacted by Kellerman, he offers them complete exoneration if they hand over Scylla to a contact who is a member of the United Nations, which they do and are all exonerated.

Following their exoneration, Michael's nose begins to bleed, indicating that the tumor which was treated earlier in the series is back. In the series epilogue set 4 years later, Lincoln owns a scuba shop with Sofia. In his very last scene, Lincoln puts an origami crane on Michael's gravestone and walks off into the sunset with Mahone, Sucre, Michael's son (who is Lincoln's nephew), and Sara.

The Final Break

After hearing of the bounty on Sara's head in prison, Lincoln agrees to help Michael break her out. Lincoln, with Sucre, scope out the prison, taking measurements and photographs to create a map of the prison. Lincoln later goes to the men's prison attached to where Sara is, and attempts to convince T-Bag to set a fire at 7pm. T-Bag requests $100,000 to set the fire and instructs Lincoln whom to steal the money from and how to get it, which he eventually steals for himself. At the end of the movie, Lincoln is shown on a boat moving to the Dominican Republic.

Personality
In the first two seasons Lincoln is revealed as very strong, both physically and mentally, and he shows himself as very threatening (to the point of fighting five of T-Bag's men single-handedly to defend a CO during a riot) and intimidating. Despite that, he is revealed as unable to kill. After defeating Mahone in the episode "Fin Del Camino", his hesitation to shoot him allows Mahone to regain the advantage and defeat him, causing him to tell Michael, "Deep down, he's just like you. He has a heart that can't kill a man." In season three, Lincoln kills for the first time, shooting one of the Company operatives and appearing to have no remorse.

In season four, Lincoln Burrows appears to have grown ruthless and cruel, acting just like a company agent (including the suit and gun), not hesitating to fire his gun and willing to torture people (seen when he rips out T-Bag's teeth). After the Company is taken down once and for all, Lincoln reverts to his original self, no longer a killer, but a family man once again...

Concept and creation

Purcell was cast three days before the start of production and consequently, he was the last actor to join the original cast. He auditioned for the role while he had a recurring role as Tommy Ravetto on North Shore. Since working on John Doe, Purcell has had an amiable relationship with Fox. Hence, he was sent the pilot script of Prison Break. Scheuring's first impression of Purcell did not convince him as a fit for the role since the actor went to the audition with his hair styled and a tan. However, Purcell's acting won the role. He arrived on the set on the first day of filming with a shaved head, which amazed Scheuring with the physical likeness of the series' two leading actors.

Production details
Paul Adelstein, who plays Lincoln's nemesis for the first 35 episodes as Paul Kellerman, originally auditioned for the role of Lincoln.
Johnny Messner and Eric Dane were joint choices for the role but executives couldn't decide who to go with so they searched for someone else resulting in Dominic Purcell's casting.

Relationships

Family tree

References

Adoptee characters in television
Fictional characters from Illinois
Television characters introduced in 2005
Fictional murderers
Fictional people sentenced to death
Fictional prison escapees
Prison Break characters